Dulwich College Seoul (DCSL) is a British international school in Banpo-dong, Seocho-gu, Seoul, South Korea. Affiliated with Dulwich College, it serves students from Reception (age 4) to Year 13 (age 18; US Grade 12). It was established in 2010, opening on August 20 of that year. There are currently around 700 students, and 200 staff in the school.

It is adjacent to Gangnam. In addition it is in proximity to Seorae Village and Hannam-dong, each being a five-minute and fifteen minute car drive away. The shinbanpo subway station is also a two-minute walk from campus.

The building has seven floors, five above ground. It also has a pool.

The school has had three heads of school: Bernard Orchard (2010-2014), Graeme Salt (2014-2020), and Gudmundur Hegner Jonsson (2020-).

References

External links

 Dulwich College Seoul

Dulwich College
British international schools in Asia
International schools in Seoul
2010 establishments in South Korea
Educational institutions established in 2010
Seocho District